The Dominican Republic is divided into thirty–one provincias (provinces; singular provincia), while the national capital, Santo Domingo, is contained within its own Distrito Nacional ("National District"; "D.N." on the map below).

The division of the country into provinces is laid down in the constitution (Title I, Section II, Article 5) and enacted by law. The latter is currently Law 5220 on the Territorial Division of the Dominican Republic (Ley No. 5220 sobre División Territorial de la República Dominicana), issued 1959 and frequently amended to create new provinces and lower-level administrative units.

The provinces as administrative divisions

The provinces are the first–level administrative subdivisions of the country. The headquarters of the central government's regional offices are normally found in the capital cities of provinces. The president appoints an administrative governor (Gobernador Civil) for each province but not for the Distrito Nacional (Title IX of the constitution).

The provinces are divided into municipalities (municipios), which are the second–level political and administrative subdivisions of the country.

The Distrito Nacional was created in 1936. Prior to this, the Distrito National was the old Santo Domingo Province, in existence since the country's independence in 1844. It is not to be confused with the new Santo Domingo Province split off from it in 2001. While it is similar to a province in many ways, the Distrito Nacional differs in its lack of an administrative governor and consisting only of one municipality, Santo Domingo, the city council (ayuntamiento) and mayor (síndico) which are in charge of its administration.

The provinces as constituencies
The provinces are also constituencies for the elections to the bicameral National Congress (Congreso de la República). Each province elects one member of the Senate (Senado) and a guaranteed minimum of two members of the Chamber of Deputies (Cámara de Diputados).

Statistics
The following is a table of the provinces and their capital cities. The population figures are from the 2021 population estimate.

Map

See also
Geography of the Dominican Republic
Demographics of Dominican Republic
ISO 3166-2:DO

References

External links
  Oficina Nacional de Estadística (National Statistics Office). Official statistics portal of the Dominican Republic.
  Blog of the Dominican Republic, videos, news, culture and music

 
Subdivisions of the Dominican Republic
Dominican Republic, Provinces
Dominican Republic 1
Provinces, Dominican Republic
Dominican Republic geography-related lists